Catholic tradition includes specific prayers and devotions as acts of reparation for insults and blasphemies against Jesus Christ and the Holy Name of Jesus. These include the sufferings during the Passion of Jesus. Similar prayers as Acts of Reparation to the Virgin Mary and Acts of Reparation to The Holy Trinity also exist.

These prayers are recited with the intent to repair the sins of others, e.g. when the Name of Jesus Christ is taken in vain, for the repair of the sin of blasphemy or the insults against and sufferings of Jesus in Calvary. Pope John Paul II referred to reparation as the "unceasing effort to stand beside the endless crosses on which the Son of God continues to be crucified".

Specific Roman Catholic organizations with this purpose exist. For instance, the Archconfraternity of Reparation for blasphemy and the neglect of Sunday was founded by Msgr. Pierre Louis Parisis in 1847 and the Archconfraternity of the Holy Face was founded in 1851 by Leo Dupont, the "Holy Man of Tours". In 1950, the abbot Hildebrand Gregori formed the organization "Prayerful Sodality" which in 1977 became the Pontifical Congregation of the Benedictine Sisters of the Reparation of the Holy Face.

Apparitions and reparations 
The need for prayers of reparation has also been emphasized within messages reported as part of Marian apparitions. A key recent example is the apparition of Our Lady of Akita in 1973 in which Sister Agnes Sasagawa reported the following message from the Blessed Virgin Mary:

 "Many men in this world afflict the Lord. I desire souls to console Him to soften the anger of the Heavenly Father."

The Eternal Word Television Network says although there is no recorded approval from the Vatican, the local bishop's approval of this private revelation has yet to be overruled.

The need for prayers of repentance, reparation and penance was also emphasized in the reported messages of Our Lady of Kibeho in 1982.

Rosary of the Holy Wounds 

The Rosary of the Holy Wounds is a Rosary based prayer but it does not include the usual mysteries of the rosary. It is primarily directed at the sufferings of Jesus Christ and was first presented by Marie Martha Chambon who lived in Chambéry, France and died in 1907.

She reported that Jesus Christ appeared to her asked her to unite her sufferings with His as an Act of Reparation for the sins of the world. It also has special applicability to the souls in Purgatory.

Prayer of reparation for insults and blasphemies 
Words of the prayer:

 O Jesus, my Saviour and Redeemer, Son of the living God, behold, we kneel before Thee and offer Thee our reparation; we would make amends for all the blasphemies uttered against Thy holy name, for all the injuries done to Thee in the Blessed Sacrament, for all the irreverence shown toward Thine Immaculate Virgin Mother, for all the calumnies and slanders spoken against Thy spouse, the holy Catholic and Roman Church. O Jesus, who hast said: "If you ask the Father anything in My name, He will give it to you", we pray and beseech Thee for all our brethren who are in danger of sin; shield them from every temptation to fall away from the true faith; save those who are even now standing on the brink of the abyss; to all of them give light and knowledge of the truth, courage and strength for the conflict with evil, perseverance in faith and active charity! For this do we pray, most merciful Jesus, in Thy name, unto God the Father, with whom Thou livest and reignest in the unity of the Holy Spirit world without end. Amen

The Golden Arrow 

The Golden Arrow prayer is part of the devotion to the Holy Name of Jesus and to the Holy Face of Jesus and appears in the book The Golden Arrow, the autobiography of Sister Mary of Saint Peter. In her book she wrote that in her visions of Jesus she was told that an act of sacrilege or blasphemy is like a "poisoned arrow", hence the name "Golden Arrow" for this reparatory prayer.

Words of the prayer:

 May the Most Holy, Most Sacred, Most Adorable,
 Most Incomprehensible and ineffable Name of God 
 be forever praised, blessed, loved, adored
 and glorified in Heaven, on earth,
 and under the earth, 
 by all the creatures of God,
 and by the Sacred Heart of Our Lord Jesus Christ, 
 in the Most Holy Sacrament of the Altar.
 Amen.

Another translation:

May the Most Holy, Most Sacred, Most Adorable,
Most Mysterious and Unutterable Name of God
be praised, blessed, loved, adored
and glorified, in Heaven, on earth,
and in the hells,
by all God's creatures
and by the Sacred Heart of Our Lord and Savior Jesus Christ
in the Most Holy Sacrament of the Altar.
Amen.

See also 

 Acts of Reparation
 Acts of Reparation to the Virgin Mary
 Acts of Reparation to The Holy Trinity
 Rosary of the Holy Wounds
 Apostle of the Holy Face
 Visions of Jesus and Mary

Notes 

12.  Janvier, Rev. P. The Life of Sister Saint-Pierre. 1885. Imprimatur of the Archbishop of Tours.

Catholic devotions
Catholic spirituality
Acts of reparation
Catholic adoration of Jesus